(The Queen's Lace Handkerchief) is an operetta by Johann Strauss II. The libretto by Heinrich Bohrmann-Riegen and Richard Genée was based on the Spanish writer Cervantes.

It was first performed on 1 October 1880 in Vienna at the Theater an der Wien under the composer's direction by Therese Braunecker-Schäfer, Alexander Girardi, Eugenie Erdösy, Karoline Tellheim, Hermine Meyerhoff, Felix Schweighofer and Ferdinand Schütz. The piece was adapted for Broadway in 1882, with some additional songs by Solomon and Stephens, and (once the new Casino Theatre solved its mechanical problems) ran successfully for 130 performances.

The work is rather obscure nowadays, but the waltz "" (Roses from the South), which incorporates melodies from the operetta, is well known. A revised version by Erich Wolfgang Korngold under the title  (The Song of Love) was premiered in Berlin on 23 December 1931 with Richard Tauber and Anny Ahlers in leading roles.

Roles

Recordings

References

External links

Operas by Johann Strauss II
1880 operas
German-language operettas
Operas